Meshkov (from мешок meaning a bag) is a Russian masculine surname. Its feminine counterpart is Meshkova. The name Meshkov may refer to
Leonid Meshkov (1916–1986),  Soviet swimmer
Nikita Meshkovs (born 1994), Latvian chess grandmaster
Sydney Meshkov  (born 1927), American theoretical physicist
Valery Meshkov (born 1945), Soviet figure skater 
Viktor Meshkov (born 1926), Soviet cyclist
Vitali Meshkov (born 1983), Russian football referee
Yuriy Meshkov (1945-2019), Crimean politician

Russian-language surnames